Wolfen is a town in the district Anhalt-Bitterfeld, Saxony-Anhalt, Germany. Since 1 July 2007 it is part of the town Bitterfeld-Wolfen. It is situated approximately 6 kilometres northwest of Bitterfeld, and 20 kilometres south of Dessau.

History 
The first documentary mention of Wolfen was as Wulffen in 1400 in a fee (feudal tenure). The place name was named after a founder whose name began with Wolf. In 1846 lignite was found in the region which was mined and the current Silver Lake was developed from this mine. Later the area became a center of the German chemical industry.

In the early 1930s an early photographic plate was produced in Wolfen by Agfa, and by 1936 the same company commercialized the more technically advanced Agfacolor Neu color transparency film, which had been developed by in Wolfen.

During World War II hundreds of women, children, and men from countries under Nazi domination were forced to work in the IG-Farben factories.  After the war, the rights to the Agfa brandname were lost to the West German company, and the Wolfen company's products were rebranded ORWO (ORiginal WOlfen). ORWO was one of the worldwide trademarks of the GDR. During GDR years, Wolfen became a dormitory community for people working at the Bitterfeld and Wolfen industrial plants (Filmfabrik Wolfen, Chemiekombinat Bitterfeld (including the former IG Farben factory, Farbenfabrik, Wolfen)), and the lignite mining company, BKK Bitterfeld (today: MIBRAG).

Historical Population
As of 31 December, unless otherwise noted

Data since 1995: Statistisches Landesamt Sachsen-Anhalt

Industry
After German reunification, the whole area has suffered from disinvestment, deindustrialization, and depopulation. Unemployment became a serious problem. As a result, population decreased by approximately 50%. Since the 1990s industrial employment has rebounded, with investments by Bayer (the headquarters of Viverso is in the town), Hereaus, Q-Cells and Guardian Industries. Significant local concerns include Organica Feinchemie GmbH Wolfen.

Notable people 
 Wolfgang Haubold (born 1937), chemist and university’s president
 Heinz Zander (born 1939), painter, draughtsman, graphic artist, illustrator and writer
 Lioba Winterhalder (1945–2012), set and costume designer
 Wolfgang Böhme (born 1949), handball player and coach
 Paul Werner Wagner (born 1948), literary scholar
 Petra Wust (born 1952), graduate engineer economist, Mayor of Wolfen and Bitterfeld-Wolfen
 Frank Lienert-Mondanelli (born 1955), actor and director
 Michael Stein (born 1956), pop singer
 Roger Pyttel (born 1957), swimmer
 Bernhard Hoff (born 1959), athlete and olympian
 Ulf Langheinrich (born 1960), visual artist and composer
 Manfred Wilde (born 1962), historian and Mayor of the City of Delitzsch
 Thomas Konietzco (born 1963), president, German Canoe Federation, Vice President, ICF
 Axel Andrae (born 1965), bassoonist
 Ralph Bock (born 1967), molecular biologist
 Iris Junik (1968–2009), actress
 René Tretschok (born 1968), professional football player and coach (Hallescher FC, Borussia Dortmund, Hertha BSC, FC Grün-Weiß Wolfen)
 Katrin Huß (born 1969), journalist and TV presenter 
 Karen Forkel (born 1970), track and field athlete and an Olympic medal winner
 Doreen Nixdorf (born 1972), actress
 Hendrik Otto (born 1974), cook (two-Star Michelin)
 Denise Zich (born 1975), actress and singer
 Raik Dalgas (born 1976), artist and aphorist
 Julia Schmidt (born 1976), painter
 Christian Gille (born 1976), canoeist
 Ondrej Drescher (born 1977), painter
 Gabriel Machemer (born 1977), writer and artist
 Yvonne Schuring (born 1978), canoeist
 André Rößler (born 1978), actor and director
 Gregor Kiedorf (born 1985), engineer and lifeguard
 Marinus Schöberl (1985–2002), victim of extreme right violence
 Daniel Roi (born 1987), politician, member of the State Parliament of Saxony-Anhalt since 2016
 Oliver Hampel (born 1985), football player
 Franziska Hentke (born 1989), swimmer
 Robin Sowa (born 1999), volleyball and beach volleyball player

References

Towns in Saxony-Anhalt
Anhalt-Bitterfeld